Silencer is a 2006 acoustic album by American singer-songwriter Blake Morgan. It features Morgan on vocals and piano performing acoustic versions of both new and older material, dating back to 1996. A cover of "No Surprises" by Radiohead was also released as a digital bonus track.

Reception
AllMusic gave the album 3 out of 5 stars and said "These are darkly heartfelt, enigmatic and melodic songs that often bring to mind a mix of the yearning, expansive rock of the Smashing Pumpkins and the soulful AM pop of Todd Rundgren. Meditative and sanguine, these are afterglow torch songs for the alt rock set."

Track listing
"Silver Lining" - 4:11
"Danger To Wake You" - 3:37
"Sick For You" - 3:23
"It's Gone" - 4:55
"Saccharine" - 4:39
"Burn You Down" - 4:04
"Craze" - 4:36
"Out of Loss" - 4:15
"Better Angeles" - 4:44
"No Surprises" - 3:46

References

External links

2006 albums
ECR Music Group albums
Albums produced by Blake Morgan